(born August 30, 1975 in Hokkaidō, Japan) is a female badminton player from Japan.

Nakayama competed in badminton at the 2004 Summer Olympics in women's doubles with partner Keiko Yoshimoti.  They had a bye in the first round and were defeated by Saralee Thungthongkam and Sathinee Chankrachangwong of Thailand in the round of 16.

Achievements

IBF International Series 

Women's doubles

External links
2004 Japanese Olympic Committee

1975 births
Living people
Olympic badminton players of Japan
Badminton players at the 2004 Summer Olympics
Japanese female badminton players